Madhugiri is a city in Tumkur district in the Indian state of Karnataka. The city derives its name from a hillock, Madhu-giri (honey-hill) which lies to its south. Madhugiri is one of the 34 educational districts of the Karnataka state.

Geography
It has an average elevation of 787 metres (2582 feet).

Madhugiri Fort lies in Madhugiri which is in the Tumkur district in the State of Karnataka. Madhu-giri is a single hill and the second largest monolith in entire Asia. Many tourists go to Madhugiri to visit the fort, which is famous for its architecture. The fort, perched atop the steep slope of a hill, was built by the Vijayanagar Dynasty.

Demographics
 India census, Madhugiri had a population of 29,215. Males constitute 52% of the population and females 48%. Madhugiri has an average literacy rate of 72%, higher than the national average of 59.5%: male literacy is 77%, and female literacy is 67%. In Madhugiri, 11% of the population is under 6 years of age.

Tourism 

The Mandaragiri temple complex is an important Jain pilgrimage centre named after Mallinatha, the 19th Tirthankara. The temple complex includes 6 temples and one stupa with earliest temple datable to twelfth-century.

See also 
 Tumkur District
 Taluks of Karnataka

References

Cities and towns in Tumkur district
Forts in Karnataka
Buildings and structures in Tumkur district